The 1984 college football season may refer to:

 1984 NCAA Division I-A football season
 1984 NCAA Division I-AA football season
 1984 NCAA Division II football season
 1984 NCAA Division III football season
 1984 NAIA Division I football season
 1984 NAIA Division II football season